Gubachevo is a rural locality (a village) in Novoalexandrovskoye Rural Settlement, Suzdalsky District, Vladimir Oblast, Russia. The population was 6 as of 2010.

Geography 
Gubachevo is located on the Kamenka River, 18 km southwest of Suzdal (the district's administrative centre) by road. Tsibeyevo is the nearest rural locality.

References 

Rural localities in Suzdalsky District